Bot-Makak is a town and commune in Cameroon.

Demographics 
Bot-Makak registered a population of 17,089 in the 2005 census. According to that census 50.3% of residents are male and 49.7% are female. 75.1% live rurally, while the other 24.9% live in an urban environment.

See also 
 Communes of Cameroon

References 

 Site de la primature – Élections municipales 2002 
 Contrôle de gestion et performance des services publics communaux des villes camerounaises- Thèse de Donation Avele, Université Montesquieu Bordeaux IV 
 Charles Nanga, La réforme de l’administration territoriale au Cameroun à la lumière de la loi constitutionnelle n° 96/06 du 18 janvier 1996, Mémoire ENA. 
  - Collins Maps

Populated places in Centre Region (Cameroon)
Communes of Cameroon